Vrhovine is a town and a municipality in Lika-Senj County, Croatia. The municipality is part of Lika.

Languages and names 

On the territory of Vrhovine municipality, in addition to Croatian which is official in the whole country, Serbian language and Serbian Cyrillic alphabet have been introduced as a second official language.

Demographics
According to 2001 census, Vrhovine had 905 inhabitants of which 55.03% were Serbs and 38.45% were Croats. In the 2011 census, there were 1,381 inhabitants of which 80.23% were Serbs and 12.74% were Croats. The majority of the population of the municipality is elderly. Because of this, the Croatian Ministry of Family Affairs, War Veterans and Intergenerational Solidarity and the United Nations Development Programme secured funding for a centre for the elderly. The centre was opened by Minister Jadranka Kosor in June, 2008.

References

Municipalities of Croatia
Populated places in Lika-Senj County